Lokuta may refer to several places in Estonia:

Lokuta, Järva County, village in Türi Parish, Järva County
Lokuta, Lääne-Viru County, village in Tapa Parish, Lääne-Viru County
Lokuta, Kehtna Parish, village in Kehtna Parish, Rapla County
Lokuta, Märjamaa Parish, village in Märjamaa Parish, Rapla County